This article concerns the period 869 BC – 860 BC.

Events and trends
 865 BC—Kar Kalmaneser (also known as Tell Ahmar and Til Barsib), an independent Neo-Hittite kingdom located in current Syria on the banks of the Euphrates River, is conquered by the Assyrian king Ashurnasirpal II. 
 864 BC—Diognetus, King of Athens, dies after a reign of 28 years (beginning 892 BC), and is succeeded by his son Pherecles. 
 860 BC—The kingdom of Urartu is unified.

Significant people
 Joash, king of Judah, is born (approximate date).
 Shoshenq III, pharaoh of Egypt, is born (approximate date).

References